The 2018–19 South African Premier Division season (known as the ABSA Premiership for sponsorship reasons) was the 23rd season of the Premier Soccer League since its establishment in 1996. The season began in August 2018 and concluded in May 2019. Mamelodi Sundowns are the champions.

Team Changes 

The following teams have changed division since the 2017–18 season.

To National First Division
Relegated from 2017-18 South African Premier Division
 Platinum Stars
 Ajax Cape Town

From National First Division
Promoted to 2018–19 South African Premier Division
 Highlands Park
 Black Leopards

Teams

Stadium and Locations

Number of teams by province

Personnel and kits

Managerial changes

League table

Results

Statistics

Top scorers

Assists

Clean Sheets

Hat-tricks

Discipline

Player
 Most yellow cards: 10
  Danny Phiri (Golden Arrows)
 Most red cards: 2
  Nyiko Mobbie (Free State Stars)
  Robyn Johannes (Bidvest Wits)
  Taariq Fielies (Cape Town City)
  Khuliso Mudau (Black Leopards)

Team
 Most yellow cards: 50
 Bidvest Wits 
 Most red cards: 4
 Free State Stars
 Fewest yellow cards: 25
 Black Leopards 
 Fewest red cards: 0
 Kaizer Chiefs 
 SuperSport United
 AmaZulu 
 Chippa United

References

External links
Premier Soccer League (PSL) Official Website
PSL Match Centre

South Africa
Premier Division
Premier Soccer League seasons